Cloves is the second studio album by Irish ambient musician Seamus Ó Muíneacháin.

Background and release

O'Muineachain produced the album while living, "a 'boring' life, alone in a small town." The album was released on 28 June 2017 and was broadcast on radio stations including RTÉ, and Star's End, and received a positive critical reception, with PureMzine writing "‘Cloves’ genuinely moves the soul", and The Irish Times naming it their Release of the week on 10 August 2017.

Track listing
 "Dusks" – 2:36
 "Sometimes We Fly" – 3:24
 "Gom" – 4:08
 "Interval for Avril" – 1:45
 "The City from Her Bedroom" – 3:18
 "Forest Frost" – 3:35
 "Moonfire" – 2:28
 "Radaitheora" – 3:05
 "Nightdreaming" – 3:19
 "Dawns" - 3:14

References

Jimmy Monaghan albums
2017 albums